Oorakkad is a town in Kizhakkambalam panchayath near city of Kochi, India.

Organizations
 Govt. U P School, Oorakkad

Religious places
 St. Thomas Jacobite Syrian Orthodox Church, Oorakkad

 Sree Krishna Temple, Oorakkad

Location

References 

Cities and towns in Ernakulam district